Wyatt Davis (born February 17, 1999) is an American football guard for the New York Giants of the National Football League (NFL). He played college football at Ohio State and was drafted by the Minnesota Vikings in the third round of the 2021 NFL Draft.

Early life and high school
Davis grew up in Rancho Palos Verdes, California, and attended St. John Bosco High School. Davis was rated a five-star recruit by Rivals, 247Sports and Scout and committed to play college football at Ohio State over offers from Alabama, Michigan, Notre Dame, Stanford, UCLA, USC and Washington.

College career
Davis redshirted his true freshman season. Originally a reserve guard during his redshirt freshman season, Davis started the final two games of the Buckeyes' season, the 2018 Big Ten Football Championship Game and the 2019 Rose Bowl, and played a total of 241 total snaps. As a redshirt sophomore, Davis was named first-team All-Big Ten Conference and a first team All-American by the Associated Press and the Sporting News. Davis was named to the Big Ten Network's second-team All-Decade team for the 2010s.

Following the announcement that the Big Ten would postpone the 2020 season, Davis announced that he would opt out but returned when the conference reversed its decision, and he was named a unanimous All-American. He declared for the 2021 NFL Draft following the season.

Professional career

Minnesota Vikings
Davis was drafted in the third round (86th overall) by the Minnesota Vikings in the 2021 NFL Draft.

2021 season: Rookie year
Heading into his inaugural training camp in the NFL, Davis was the starting right guard for the Vikings, but he also faced competition from Oli Udoh.  After struggling heavily in the Vikings' preseason games, Davis was named the backup right guard behind Udoh for the 2021 season.  

Davis finished his rookie season having appeared in 6 games (0 starts), playing exclusively on special teams and recording zero offensive snaps.

2022 season
Davis competed for a starting job in training camp against Udoh, Jesse Davis, and rookie Ed Ingram. On August 30, 2022, Davis was waived by the Vikings as a part of final roster cuts.

New York Giants
On September 1, 2022, the New York Giants signed Davis to their practice squad.

New Orleans Saints 
On September 8, 2022, the New Orleans Saints signed Davis to their active roster. He was waived on November 8.

Arizona Cardinals
On November 9, 2022, Davis was claimed off waivers by the Arizona Cardinals. He was released on December 27, 2022.  He was waived on December 27.

New York Giants
On December 28, 2022, Davis was claimed off waivers by the New York Giants.

Personal life
Davis is the son of actor Duane Davis, mother Inge Davis and the grandson of Pro Football Hall of Famer Willie Davis.

References

External links
Minnesota Vikings bio
 Ohio State Buckeyes bio

1999 births
Living people
People from Bellflower, California
Players of American football from California
Sportspeople from Los Angeles County, California
American football offensive guards
Ohio State Buckeyes football players
All-American college football players
Minnesota Vikings players
New York Giants players
New Orleans Saints players
Arizona Cardinals players